Alice Miceli (born 1980) is a Brazilian artist. She currently lives and works between Rio de Janeiro and New York.

She was born  and raised in Rio de Janeiro, and studied film at the École supérieure d'études cinématographiques in Paris.

Miceli works with video and still photographs. She has participated in the 2009 Festival Internacional de Artes Electrónicas y Video TRANSITIO_MX in Mexico City, the 2010 São Paulo Art Biennial, the 2014 Japan Media Arts Festival in Tokyo and the 2016 Moscow International Biennale for Young Art. Her work has also been exhibited at several transmediale festivals in Berlin, at the Sydney Film Festival in 2008 and the Images Festival in Toronto in 2008.

She was awarded the PIPA Prize in 2014. In 2016, Miceli was a fellow at the Jan van Eyck Academie in Maastricht; she has also been a fellow at the Dora Maar House in Ménerbes, and at Yaddo and the MacDowell Colony. She received the Cisneros Fontanals Grants & Commissions Award in 2015. In 2019, her work "Projeto Chernobyl" was presented for the first time in its complete form in the US, at the Americas Society, in New York. For this work, Miceli developed a method of image making to document the enduring effects of the Soviet nuclear plant explosion of April 26, 1986. Though gamma radiation continues to be present and to cause health problems and deaths in the area, it is invisible to the naked eye and to traditional methods of photography that have been used to document the region’s ruins. With Projeto Chernobyl, Miceli made this contamination visible via direct contact between the radiation and film, which was exposed in the Chernobyl Exclusion Zone for months at a time. Both technically and conceptually complex, Miceli’s work questions our ideas of vision, memory, politics, and environmental issues.

References

External links 
 

1980 births
Living people
21st-century Brazilian women artists
21st-century Brazilian artists